James Douglas (1426 – 22 October 1493), the 4th Lord of Dalkeith, was created the 1st Earl of Morton in 1458.

Life
He was the son of James Douglas, 2nd Lord of Dalkeith and Elizabeth Gifford, daughter of James Gifford of Sheriffhall. His father resigned all his estates to James in 1456 when James became the 4th Lord of Dalkeith. James was created Earl of Morton in 1458 upon his marriage to Joan Stewart (1428-1493), the daughter of James I, King of Scots. She was a deaf-mute.

The Earl entered into a marriage contract with Patrick Graham, Bishop of St. Andrews between the Bishop's niece and John Douglas, the Earl's eldest son and heir. In turn the Grahams, the Bishop, his brother and nephew, allied themselves to the Earl and pledged to assist him in recovering the diverted lands of Whittingehame and Morton. It appears, however, that this pledge was intended to draw the Earl of Morton into a conspiracy that included the Bishop, Lord Boyd and his party. Robert Boyd, 1st Lord Boyd who, as one of the Regents during the minority of James III of Scotland, took possession of the young king and married his son to the king's elder sister, for which crimes he was later attainted for high treason. The Earl of Morton apparently did not participate since he sat on the jury which convicted the Boyds. Bishop Graham was later excommunicated and deposed.

The lands of Whittinghame and all rights over the barony of Morton, Dumfriesshire were resigned into the Earl's hands in 1473-4 and in that same year he recovered the lordship of Dalkeith increasing the Earls already vast estates. He re-endowed the collegiate church at Dalkeith his 3rd great-grandfather founded and he also founded St. Martha's Hospital in Aberdour in 1474. The Earl died on 22 October 1493 when his son John succeeded him as the 2nd Earl of Morton. His wife Joan predeceased him by 4 months dying on 22 June 1493.

The Morton Monument
The Earl and Countess of Morton were buried together in the choir of the parish church of St. Nicholas Buccleuch, known as the Dalkeith Collegiate Church, in Dalkeith, south of Fife and east of Edinburgh, in Midlothian, Scotland. Known as the Morton Monument, their tombs are covered with their stone effigies, complete with their armorial bearings. The choir is now in the ruins, leaving the tombs out in the open, where, in a few centuries, the elements have erased their faces. Their hands, pressed together in prayer, were likely to have been destroyed during the Reformation. Today, as one of the visitors remarked, "[o]nce crisply carved and detailed with heraldic devices", the tombs have "the look of sand sculptures after the tide has washed in and retreated". Due to their historical value, in 2005 a team of volunteers and preservationists created a protective canopy over their effigies.

Family
He and his wife Joan were the parents of:

 Sir John Douglas, 2nd Earl of Morton.
 James, appeared in several writs 1466–1480.
 Janet, married bef. 1 February 1490–1 to Sir Patrick Hepburn, 1st Earl of Bothwell.
 Elizabeth, she was mentioned in a charter of 1479.

Notes

References

External links 
 Charles Cawley, "Scotland, Earls Created, 1162-1398:  Earls of Morton", Medieval Lands:  A propsography of medieval European noble and royal families.

1493 deaths
Earls of Morton
James Douglas, 1st Earl of Morton
15th-century Scottish people
1426 births
Peers created by James II of Scotland